Helen F. Thompson was an American businesswoman and politician.

Born in the town of Menasha in Winnebago County, Wisconsin, Thompson owned a hotel in Park Falls, Wisconsin and was also a teacher. She was also the President of the Red Cross chapter in Price County, Wisconsin. Thompson served on the Park Falls School Board. Then, she served on the Wisconsin State Assembly in 1925 and 1927 and was a Republican.

References

Year of birth unknown
Year of death unknown
People from Park Falls, Wisconsin
People from Menasha, Wisconsin
Businesspeople from Wisconsin
Educators from Wisconsin
American women educators
School board members in Wisconsin
Women state legislators in Wisconsin
Republican Party members of the Wisconsin State Assembly